Luxembourg competed at the 2012 European Athletics Championships held in Helsinki, Finland, between 27 June to 1 July 2012. 4 competitors, 3 men and 1 woman took part in 4 events.

Results

Men
Track events

Women
Field events

References
 

2012
Nations at the 2012 European Athletics Championships
2012 in Luxembourgian sport